Osmodes adonia, the Adonia white-spots, is a butterfly in the family Hesperiidae. It is found in Nigeria, Cameroon, Gabon, the Central African Republic, the Democratic Republic of the Congo, western Uganda and north-western Tanzania. The habitat consists of forests.

References

Butterflies described in 1937
Erionotini